Sabero is a village in the province of León, Castile and León, in north-western Spain.  According to the 2019 census (INE), the municipality has a population of 1,140 inhabitants.

It is the location of the Castile and León Museum of Metallurgy and Mining (Museo de la Siderurgia y de la Minería de Castilla y León). This was opened on 3 July 2008 by Juan Vicente Herrera Campo, the president of Castile and León.

References

Municipalities in the Province of León